The Cascade Blanche (or Cascade de Ravine Blanche) is a waterfall on the island of Réunion, overseas department French in the southwest Indian Ocean.

Description
Formed by the Ravine Blanche, a tributary of the Rivière du Mât, the waterfall is located on the territory of the commune of Bras-Panon but is nevertheless often associated with Salazie, being especially visible from the Route de Salazie. It is also located in the Parc national de La Réunion.

It is possible to practice canyonism in the waterfall.

See also
List of waterfalls by height

References

Canyons and gorges of France
Landforms of Réunion
Waterfalls of Réunion
Réunion National Park